Diane Brandt (August 28, 1938 – June 1, 2010) was an American politician who served in the Iowa House of Representatives from the 35th district from 1975 to 1983. In 2003, she established an endowed fund with Iowa State University to provide scholarships for women in science, engineering, mathematics and agriculture, which came into effect in 2012.

References

1938 births
2010 deaths
Democratic Party members of the Iowa House of Representatives